Hokkaido Refinery is an oil refinery in Hokkaido, Japan. The refinery began operations in 1973 to supply regions in northern Japan. It is operated by Idemitsu Kosan.

2003 fires
Following the 2003 Hokkaido earthquake, a major fire started in the naphtha storage tank. It burned for almost 34 hours before being put out. A second fire started because of aftershocks caused by the massive earthquake. Refinery workers found damage in 29 of the refinery's oil tanks.

Increase in oil supply
In October of 2013 Idemitsu Kosan said they will increase the oil supply in the Hokkaido Refinery by February 2014, after declaring they are shutting down the Tokuyama refinery.

References

Oil refineries